Croatian–Ottoman Wars can refer to one of the several conflicts between the Kingdom of Croatia (as part of Kingdom of Hungary-Croatia and Habsburg Monarchy) and the Ottoman Empire:
Long Campaign (1443–1444) of the King Vladislaus II of Hungary
Hundred Years' Croatian–Ottoman War, War for Croatia - a period of near constant mostly low-intensity warfare ("Small War") approximately 1493–1593 (from the Battle of Krbava Field to the Battle of Sisak)
Long War (1593–1606)
Austro-Turkish War (1663–1664)
Great Turkish War (1683–1699)
Austro-Turkish War (1716–1718)
Austro-Turkish War (1787–1791)

The Kingdom of Croatia-Hungary gradually lost most of its territory on the eastern Adriatic coast to the Ottomans, leaving only the possessions of the Republic of Venice in Dalmatia, for whom the Croats took part in the Ottoman–Venetian Wars. Of particular note for the history of Dalmatia was the Morean War.

See also 
Ottoman–Hungarian wars
Ottoman–Habsburg wars
Hundred Years' Croatian–Ottoman War
Devshirme

Sources 
Milan Kruhek: Granice Hrvatskog Kraljevstva u međunarodnim državnim ugovorima, Povijesni prilozi 10/1991, p. 37-79
Ferdo Šišić: Pregled povijesti hrvatskog naroda 600.-1526.

Wars involving medieval Croatia
13th-century conflicts
14th-century conflicts
15th-century conflicts
16th-century conflicts
17th-century conflicts
18th-century conflicts
19th-century conflicts
Wars involving the Ottoman Empire
Wars involving Croatia
Ottoman period in the history of Croatia